The 2015 Virginia Cavaliers baseball team represented the University of Virginia during the 2015 NCAA Division I baseball season. The Cavaliers played their home games at Davenport Field as a member of the Atlantic Coast Conference. They were led by head coach Brian O'Connor, in his 12th season at Virginia.

2015 was a tough regular season for the 2014 NCAA runner-up. The Cavaliers slogged through a disappointing and injury-filled regular season. By winning 5 of its last 6 ACC games, the Cavs managed to cobble together a .500 ACC record, qualifying them for a play in game at the ACC tournament. At the tournament they won the play in game against Georgia Tech and then promptly lost the last three games.

Virginia was given an NCAA tournament berth, as a No. 3 regional seed, and the Cavs took full advantage. They swept through the Lake Elsinore (Calif.) Regional, and because Maryland, also a #3 seed, had won its regional, were able to host a Super Regional, which the Cavaliers swept as well.

In Omaha the Cavaliers won the 2015 College World Series, highlighted by winning two of three games against Florida before ousting Vanderbilt in three games in the CWS Finals. Virginia's season was notable for the Cavaliers continuing to battle in spite of numerous setbacks. That never give up attitude was evident in its post season as well: UVA scored the go-ahead run in the fifth inning or later in each of their 10 postseason wins.

Previous season
In 2014, the Cavaliers finished the season 2nd in the ACC's Coastal Division with a record of 47–14, 22–8 in conference play. They qualified for the 2014 Atlantic Coast Conference baseball tournament and were eliminated in pool play. They qualified for the 2014 NCAA Division I baseball tournament as the #3 overall national seed, and were placed in the Charlottesville Regional, of which they were hosts. Also, in the regional were Bucknell, Liberty, and Arkansas. The Cavaliers defeated Bucknell, 10–1, in the opening game, and then shut out Arkansas, 3–0, to advance to the regional final. There, they again defeated Arkansas, this time by a score of 9–2. In the Super Regional, the Cavaliers fell in the opening game to ACC foe Maryland, 4–5. However, they rebounded and defeated the Terrapins in the next two games, 7–3 and 11–2, to advance to the College World Series.

In the College World Series, Virginia's first game was against Ole Miss, whom the Cavaliers defeated, 2–1. In the second round, Virginia defeated #7 national seed TCU, 3–2, in 15 innings. In the semifinals, the Cavaliers again defeated Ole Miss, this time by a score of 4–1. The Cavaliers advanced to the College World Series finals to play Vanderbilt. In the first game of the finals, the Commodores won by a score of 9–8. Virginia then rebounded to defeat Vanderbilt, 7–2, in game two. In a winner-take-all game three, Vanderbilt prevailed, 3–2, to be crowned national champions.

Personnel

Roster

Coaching staff

Schedule

! style="background:#00214E;color:white;"| Regular Season
|- valign="top" 

|- bgcolor="#bbffbb"
| February 13 || at East Carolina || #3 || Clark–LeClair Stadium • Greenville, NC || 3–1 || Kirby (1–0) || Kruczynski (0–1) || Sborz (1) || 2,541 || 1–0 || 
|- bgcolor="#bbffbb"
| February 14 || at East Carolina || #3 || Clark–LeClair Stadium • Greenville, NC || 9–2 || Jones (1–0) || Wolfe (0–1) ||  || 3,058 || 2–0 ||
|- bgcolor="#bbffbb"
| February 15 || at East Carolina || #3 || Clark–LeClair Stadium • Greenville, NC || 4–2 || Roberts (1–0) || Boyd (0–1) || Sborz (2) || 3,058 || 3–0 ||
|- bgcolor="#bbbbbb"
| February 17 || VCU || #3 || Davenport Field • Charlottesville, VA || colspan=7|Canceled
|- bgcolor="#bbffbb"
| February 20 ||  || #3 || Bishop England High School • Charleston, S.C. || 9–1 || Kirby (2–0) || Evan (0–1) ||  || 227 || 4–0 ||
|- bgcolor="#bbffbb"
| February 21 || La Salle || #3 ||  Charleston Southern • Charleston, S.C. || 8–3 || Jones (2–0) || Andujar (0–1) || Doherty (1) || 219 || 5–0 ||
|- bgcolor="#bbffbb"
| February 21 || Marist || #3 ||  College of Charleston • Charleston, S.C. || 7–2 || Bettinger (1–0) || Vrana (0–1) || Rosenberger (1) || 255 || 6–0 ||
|- bgcolor="#bbffbb"
| February 22 || Marist || #3 || Joseph P. Riley Jr. Park • Charleston, S.C. || 5–418 || Sousa (1–0) || Bunting (0–1) ||  || 527 || 7–0 ||
|- bgcolor="#bbbbbb"
| February 24 ||  || #2 || Davenport Field • Charlottesville, VA || colspan=7|Canceled
|- bgcolor="#bbffbb"
| February 27 || Hartford || #2 || Myrtle Beach, S.C. || 5–1 || Kirby (3–0) || Gauthier (1–1) || Bettinger (1) || 255 || 8–0 ||
|- bgcolor="#bbffbb"
| February 28 ||  || #2 || Myrtle Beach, S.C. || 4–1 || Jones (3–0) || Pacillo (0–2) || Sborz (3) || 271 || 9–0 ||
|-

|- bgcolor="#bbffbb"
| March 1 || Cornell || #2 || Myrtle Beach, S.C. || 5–4 || Sborz (1–0) || Horton (0–2) ||  || 177 || 10–0 ||
|- bgcolor="#bbbbbb"
| March 4 || VMI || #2 || Davenport Field • Charlottesville, VA || colspan=7|Postponed
|- bgcolor="#ffbbbb"
| March 7 || Pittsburgh || #2 || Cary, N.C. || 0–1 || Zeuch (3–1)  || Kirby (3–1) ||  || 317 || 10–1 || 0–1
|- bgcolor="#bbffbb"
| March 7 || Pittsburgh || #2 || Cary, N.C. || 2–1 || Jones (4–0) || Sandefur (1–1) || Sborz (4)  || 317 || 11–1 || 1–1
|- bgcolor="#bbffbb"
| March 8 || Pittsburgh || #2 || Cary, N.C. || 10–3 || Waddell (1–0) ||Berube (0–2)  ||  || 728 || 12–1 || 2–1
|- bgcolor="#ffbbbb"
| March 11 || Old Dominion || #3 || Davenport Field • Charlottesville, VA || 5–14 || Diaz (3–1) || Casey (0–1)  ||  || 2,778 || 12–2 ||
|- bgcolor="#ffbbbb"
| March 13 || at Virginia Tech || #3 || English Field • Blacksburg, VA || 1–2 || Keselica (3–1) || Roberts (1–1) ||  || 419 || 12–3 || 2–2
|- bgcolor="#ffbbbb"
| March 14 || at Virginia Tech || #3 || English Field • Blacksburg, VA || 1–3 || McGarity (2–1) || Jones (4–1) || Scherzer (3) || 1,282 || 12–4 || 2–3
|- bgcolor="#ffbbbb"
| March 15 || at Virginia Tech || #3 || English Field • Blacksburg, VA || 5–6 || Coward (1–0) || Sborz (1–1) || Naughton (1) || 2,642 || 12–5 || 2–4
|- bgcolor="#bbffbb"
| March 17 ||  || #12 || Davenport Field • Charlottesville, VA || 8–0 || Bettinger (2–0) || Lawler (0–3) ||  ||2,901  || 13–5 ||
|- bgcolor="#bbffbb"
| March 20 || Florida State || #12 || Davenport Field • Charlottesville, VA || 8–4 || Doherty (1–0) || Silva (2–1) || Sborz (5) || 3,200 || 14–5 || 3–4
|- bgcolor="#ffbbbb"
| March 21 || Florida State || #12 || Davenport Field • Charlottesville, VA || 10–12 || Silva (3–1) || Sborz (1–2) ||  || 4,196 || 14–6 || 3–5
|- bgcolor="#ffbbbb"
| March 22 || Florida State || #12 || Davenport Field • Charlottesville, VA || 1–13 || Johnson (3–1) || Waddell (1–1) ||  || 3,994 || 14–7 || 3–6
|- bgcolor="#ffbbbb"
| March 24 ||  || #25 || Davenport Field • Charlottesville, VA || 0–1 || Simon (2–2) || Bettinger (2–1) || Ellingson (3) || 2,871 || 14–8 ||
|- bgcolor="#bbffbb"
| March 25 || at  || #25 || Liberty Baseball Stadium • Lynchburg, VA || 10–7 || Casey (1–1) || Stafford ||  || 2,841 || 15–8 ||
|- bgcolor="#bbffbb"
| March 27 || at Notre Dame || #25 || Frank Eck Stadium • Notre Dame, IN || 9–1 || Kirby (4–1) || Kerrigan (1–4) || Doherty (2) || 783 || 16–8 || 4–6
|- bgcolor="#bbffbb"
| March 28 || at Notre Dame || #25 || Frank Eck Stadium • Notre Dame, IN || 4–2 || Doyle (1–0) || Guenther (1–1) || Sborz (6) || 783 || 17–8 || 5–6
|- bgcolor="#bbffbb"
| March 29 || at Notre Dame || #25 || Frank Eck Stadium • Notre Dame, IN || 5–4 || Waddell (2–1) || McCarty (3–3) || Sborz (7) || 377 || 18–8 || 6–6
|- bgcolor="#bbffbb"
| March 31 || at VCU || #20 || The Diamond • Richmond, VA || 5–3 || Casey (2–1) || Concepcion (1–2) || Sborz (8) || 3,233 || 19–8 ||
|-

|- bgcolor="#ffbbbb"
| April 1 || VMI || #20 || Davenport Field • Charlottesville, VA || 6–7 || Staats (1–1) || Cummins (0–1) || Edens (4) || 3,014 || 19–9 ||
|- bgcolor="#ffbbbb"
| April 4 || Louisville || #20 || Davenport Field • Charlottesville, VA || 1–8 || Funkhouser (4–2) || Kirby (4–2) ||  || 4,372 || 19–10 || 6–7
|- bgcolor="#ffbbbb"
| April 5 || Louisville || #20 || Davenport Field • Charlottesville, VA || 4–11 || McKay (5–0) || Doherty (1–1) ||  || 3,739 || 19–11 || 6–8
|- bgcolor="#ffbbbb"
| April 6 || Louisville ||  || Davenport Field • Charlottesville, VA || 0–4 || Rogers (5–1) || Waddell (2–2) ||  || 3,278 || 19–12 || 6–9
|- bgcolor="#bbffbb"
| April 8 ||  ||  || Davenport Field • Charlottesville, VA || 14–1 || Casey (3–1) || Tucker (1–3) ||  || 3,245 || 20–12 ||
|- bgcolor="#bbffbb"
| April 10 || at Georgia Tech ||  || Russ Chandler Stadium • Atlanta, GA || 14–4 || Kirby (5–2) || King (2–2) ||  || 1,409 || 21–12 || 7–9
|- bgcolor="#ffbbbb"
| April 11 || at Georgia Tech ||  || Russ Chandler Stadium • Atlanta, GA || 4–11 || Gorst (3–2) || Conor (4–2) ||  || 2,344 || 21–13 || 7–10
|- bgcolor="#ffbbbb"
| April 12 || at Georgia Tech ||  || Russ Chandler Stadium • Atlanta, GA || 3–4 || Gold (5–1) || Waddell (2–3) || Ryan (7) || 1,641 || 21–14 || 7–11
|- bgcolor="#bbbbbb"
| April 14 ||  ||  || Davenport Field • Charlottesville, VA || colspan=7|Canceled
|- bgcolor="#bbffbb"
| April 15 ||  ||  || Davenport Field • Charlottesville, VA || 3–2 || Bettinger (3–1) || Fletcher (3–1) || Sborz (9) || 3,084 || 22–14 ||
|- bgcolor="#bbffbb"
| April 17 || Miami (FL) ||  || Davenport Field • Charlottesville, VA || 5–4 || Rosenberger (1–0) || Woodrey (4–2) || Sborz (10) || 3,589 || 23–14 || 8–11
|- bgcolor="#bbffbb"
| April 18 || Miami (FL) ||  || Davenport Field • Charlottesville, VA || 5–2 || Doherty (2–1) || Garcia (4–2) || Sborz (11) || 4,228 || 24–14 || 9–11
|- bgcolor="#ffbbbb"
| April 19 || Miami (FL) ||  || Davenport Field • Charlottesville, VA || 6–8 || Abrams (1–0) || Waddell (2–4) || Garcia (9) || 3,747 || 24–15 || 9–12
|- bgcolor="#bbffbb"
| April 21 ||  ||  || Davenport Field • Charlottesville, VA || 14–4 || Casey (4–1) || Catlin (3–2) || Roberts (1) ||  || 25–15 ||
|- bgcolor="#bbffbb"
| April 22 || Liberty ||  || Davenport Field • Charlottesville, VA || 5–2 || Haseley (1–0) || Parker (3–4) || Sborz (12) || 3,017 || 26–15 ||
|- bgcolor="#bbffbb"
| April 24 || at NC State ||  || Doak Field • Raleigh, NC || 8–3 || Jones (5–2) || Brown (3–3) ||  || 1,759 || 27–15 || 10–12
|- bgcolor="#ffbbbb"
|  April 25 || at NC State ||  || Doak Field • Raleigh, NC || 3–4 || Gilbert (1–1) || Doyle (1–1) ||  || 937 || 27–16 || 10–13
|- bgcolor="#ffbbbb"
| April 26 || at NC State ||  || Doak Field • Raleigh, NC || 3–510 || DeJuneas (2–2) || Bettinger (3–2) ||  || 1,113 || 27–17 || 10–14
|- bgcolor="#ffbbbb"
| April 28 || at Old Dominion ||  || Harbor Park • Norfolk, VA || 1–3 || Benitez (1–1) || Haseley (1–1) || Hartman (1) || 6,029 || 27–18 ||
|-

|- bgcolor="#bbffbb"
| May 8 || Duke ||  || Davenport Field • Charlottesville, VA || 3–1 || Doherty (3–1) || Istler (5–4) || Bettinger (2) || 3,723 || 28–18 || 11–14
|- bgcolor="#ffbbbb"
| May 9 || Duke ||  || Davenport Field • Charlottesville, VA || 7–9 || Labosky (2–0) || Bettinger (3–3) || Koplove (11) || 4,393 || 28–19 || 11–15
|- bgcolor="#bbffbb"
| May 10 || Duke ||  || Davenport Field • Charlottesville, VA || 4–2 || Sborz (2–2) || Clark (3–5) || Haseley (1) || 4,118 || 29–19 || 12–15
|- bgcolor="#bbffbb"
| May 12 ||  ||  || Davenport Field • Charlottesville, VA || 8–6 || Bettinger (4–3) || Lively ||  || 3,369 || 30–19 ||
|- bgcolor="#bbffbb"
| May 14 || at  ||  || Boshamer Stadium • Chapel Hill, NC || 2–110 || Haseley (2–1) || Thornton (3–6) || Bettinger (3) || 1,997  || 31–19 || 13–15
|- bgcolor="#bbffbb"
| May 15 || at North Carolina ||  || Boshamer Stadium • Chapel Hill, NC || 6–2 || Waddell (3–4) || Bukauskas (4–3) ||  || 2,957  || 32–19 || 14–15
|- bgcolor="#bbffbb"
| May 16 || at North Carolina ||  || Boshamer Stadium • Chapel Hill, NC || 8–2 || Rosenberger (2–0) || Kelley (5–3) || Doherty (3)  || 2,527 || 33–19 || 15–15
|-

|- 
! style="background:#00214E;color:white;"| Post-Season
|-

|- bgcolor="#bbffbb"
| May 19 || Georgia Tech || #29 || Durham Bulls Athletic Park • Durham, NC || 11–07 || Sborz (3–2) || King (4–5) ||  || 2,614  || 34–19 || 1–0
|- bgcolor="#ffbbbb"
| May 20 || Miami (FL) || #29 || Durham Bulls Athletic Park • Durham, NC || 5–9 || Garcia (5–2) || Bettinger (4–4) ||  || 2,774 || 34–20 || 1–1
|- bgcolor="#ffbbbb"
| May 22 || Notre Dame || #29 || Durham Bulls Athletic Park • Durham, NC || 2–8 || Smoyer (9–0) || Waddell (3–5) || Bielak (1) || 2,916 || 34–21 || 1–2
|- bgcolor="#ffbbbb"
| May 23 || NC State || #29 || Durham Bulls Athletic Park • Durham, NC || 2–10 || Williamson (4–3) || Bettinger (4–5) ||  || 7,139 || 34–22 || 1–3
|-

|- bgcolor="#bbffbb"
| May 29 || (2)  ||  || Lake Elsinore Diamond • Lake Elsinore, CA ||  6–1 || Jones (6–2)|| Davis (3–3) || Sborz (13) || 2,000 || 35–22 || 1–0
|- bgcolor="#bbffbb"
| May 30 || (4)  ||  || Lake Elsinore Diamond • Lake Elsinore, CA || 3–1 || Sborz (4–2) || Seyler (9–3) ||  || 2,114 || 36–22 || 2–0
|- bgcolor="#bbffbb"
| May 31 || (2) USC ||  || Lake Elsinore Diamond • Lake Elsinore, CA || 14–1011 || Rosenberger (3–0) || Wheatley (4–4) || Sborz (14) || 1,065 || 37–22 || 3–0
|-

|- bgcolor="#bbffbb"
| June 5 ||  || #13 || Davenport Field • Charlottesville, VA || 5–3 || Jones (7–2) || Mooney (3–1) || Sborz (14) || 5,001 || 38–22 || 4–0
|- bgcolor="#bbffbb"
| June 6 || Maryland || #13 || Davenport Field • Charlottesville, VA || 5–4 || Bettinger (5–5) || Galligan (4–5) ||  || 5,001 || 39–22 || 5–0
|-

|- bgcolor="#bbffbb"
| June 13 || #7 Arkansas || #8 || TD Ameritrade Park • Omaha, NE || 5–3 || Sborz (5–2) || Killian (3–5) ||  || 24,228 || 40–22 || 1–0
|- bgcolor="#bbffbb"
| June 15 || #2 Florida || #8 || TD Ameritrade Park • Omaha, NE || 1–0 || Waddell (4–5) || Puk (9–4) || Sborz (15) || 19,544 || 41–22 || 2–0
|- bgcolor="#ffbbbb"
| June 19 || #2 Florida || #8 || TD Ameritrade Park • Omaha, NE || 5–10 || Faedo (11–6) || Kirby (5–3) ||  || 19,015 || 41–23 || 2–1
|- bgcolor="#bbffbb"
| June 20 || #2 Florida || #8 || TD Ameritrade Park • Omaha, NE || 5–4 || Sborz (6–2) || Lewis (6–2) ||  || 15,560 || 42–23 || 3–1
|- bgcolor="#ffbbbb"
| June 22 || #5 Vanderbilt || #8 || TD Ameritrade Park • Omaha, NE || 1–5 || Fulmer (14–2) || Jones (7–3) ||  || 21,652 || 42–24 || 3–2
|- bgcolor="#bbffbb"
| June 23 || #5 Vanderbilt || #8 || TD Ameritrade Park • Omaha, NE || 3–0 || Sborz (7–2) || Pfeiffer (6–5) ||  || 24,645 || 43–24|| 4–2
|- bgcolor="#bbffbb"
| June 24 || #5 Vanderbilt || #8 || TD Ameritrade Park • Omaha, NE || 4–2 || Waddell (5–5) || Kilichowski (3–4) || Kirby (1) || 17,689  || 44–24 || 5–2 
|-

All rankings from Collegiate Baseball.

Rankings

Awards and honors
Nathan Kirby
 Louisville Slugger Pre-season First Team All-American
 Perfect Game USA Pre-season First Team All-American
 Baseball America Pre-season First team All-American
 All ACC 1st Team
Joe McCarthy
 Louisville Slugger Pre-season Second Team All-American
 Perfect Game USA Pre-season Second Team All-American
 Baseball America Pre-season Second Team All-American
Josh Sborz
 Most Outstanding Player, 2015 College World Series
 ACC Second Team
Brandon Waddell
 Louisville Slugger Pre-season Second Team All-American
 Perfect Game USA Pre-season Third Team All-American
Matt Thaiss
 Louisville Slugger 2015 Third Team All-American
Pavin Smith
 ACC All Freshman Team
 Louisville Slugger Freshmen A-A Team
Adam Haseley
 ACC All Freshman Team
 Louisville Slugger Freshmen A-A Team
 Kenny Towns
 ACC Second Team
Daniel Pinero
 ACC Second Team

References

Virginia Cavaliers
Virginia Cavaliers baseball seasons
Virginia
College World Series seasons
NCAA Division I Baseball Championship seasons